Nau Do Gyarah (the Hindi idiom means "to run away") is a 1957 Indian Hindi-language comedy thriller film produced by Dev Anand. It also classifies as a road movie. This was his brother, Vijay Anand's directorial debut. The film stars Dev Anand, Kalpana Kartik, Madan Puri, Shashikala and Jeevan. The film's music is by S. D. Burman and the lyrics are by Majrooh Sultanpuri.

Plot
The film starts with Madan Gopal being thrown out of his house for not paying the rent. He goes to visit his friend, who has been helping him collect his mail, and finds a letter from his uncle, Manoharlal. Manoharlal writes that he is willing to give eleven lakh rupees (nine lakhs of property and two lakhs worth of cash), to Madan. It was originally willed to his sister-in-law's son, Kuldeep. After seeing Kuldeep's bad behaviour, though, Manoharlal decides to give the money to Madan.

Madan promptly gets a truck and sets off for Bombay, and on the way, his friend drags him to a wedding. The two discuss the wedding, with Madan saying that if he were in the girl's place, he would run away. True enough, when an eavesdropping friend tells the bride, Raksha that the groom is Surjit, she decides to run away and hides in Madan's truck.

Raksha disguises herself as a Sikh boy with the pseudonym of "Sardar Nihal Singh" and hides in his truck. Madan discovers "him" and the two quarrel nonstop, but Madan is compelled to take him along, because the boy has money, food and water. The disguise soon comes loose and Sardar Nihal Singh is revealed to be a girl. Madan doesn't know her past, but the two of them fall in love, with Madan teasing her on several occasions, calling her a "thief". Raksha, who was unhappy with her marriage, finally finds happiness travelling with Madan.

When the two of them reach Bombay, Madan goes off to see his friend, Radheshyam, but is informed that Manoharlal has died. A shocked Madan takes out the letter and finds out that it is a few months old. Radheshyam says that all the property has gone to Kuldeep and his mother.

Production
Nau Do Gyarah was the first film directed by Vijay Anand.

Soundtrack
All lyrics written by Majrooh Sultanpuri.

References

External links

Films scored by S. D. Burman
1950s Hindi-language films
Films directed by Vijay Anand
Indian remakes of American films
1957 directorial debut films
Indian comedy thriller films